Elistanzhi cluster bomb attack occurred on October 7, 1999, in Chechnya, when two Russian Sukhoi Su-24 fighter bombers dropped several cluster bombs on the apparently undefended mountain village of Elistanzhi.

The bombing killed at least 34 (48 according to some reports) and injured some 20 to over 100 people in the small village, mostly women and children; at least nine children were reportedly killed when one bomb hit the local school. Witnesses and victims stated that there were no military objectives in the village prior to or at the time of the attack. Representatives of the Russian human rights group Memorial visited Elistanzhi shortly after the bombing and found no evidence of any Chechen separatist military presence in the village.

References

External links
VOA Report, Voice of America, 10/9/1999
CARPET BOMBARDMENT OF THE ELISTANJI VILLAGE, OCTOBER 7, 1999, Memorial, 26.10.1999 
The attack on the village of Elistanzhi (7 October), Amnesty International, 1 December 1999
Russian Warcrimes in Chechnya, 1, YouTube

See also
1995 Shali cluster bomb attack

Conflicts in 1999
1999 in Russia
Cluster bomb attacks
Massacres in Russia
Second Chechen War
Mass murder in Russia
Mass murder in 1999
October 1999 events in Russia
War crimes of the Second Chechen War